Ian Pooley (born Ian Pinnekamp in 1973) is a German record producer and DJ. While incorporating samples of various musical genres, Pooley's creations are usually classified as house or tech house with Brazilian influence.

Biography
Pooley's music career began in 1993. Fascinated by producers in Chicago and Detroit, he brought his first machines and immediately started writing house and techno music, which kickstarted a multi-decade-spanning career playing to hugely diverse audiences. In 1998, Pooley made his sole appearance on the prestigious BBC Radio One Essential Mix, which featured tracks by Slam, Jeff Mills and his own productions. After a long stretch with V2 Records, in which Pooley released several very successful albums (Meridian and Since Then), Pooley left V2 and started his own record company, Pooled Music, in 2003.

Ian Pooley has also cited on various albums (such as Brazilution 5.3 and Souvenirs) that he had an audible 'click' when listening to Brazilian music at a night club.  As such, a lot of his music has a noticeable Brazilian flavor to it. He has incorporated artists like Rosanna and Zelia and veteran musician Marcos Valle in some of his works.

In addition to original works, Pooley has remixed artists such as Deee-Lite, The Cardigans, Daft Punk, Cirque du Soleil, Carl Cox and Bob Sinclar.

Discography

Albums
1993 The Latest Adventures of Kool Killer, as Space Cube
1995 Relations
1996 The Times
1998 Meridian
1999 The Allnighter/Calypso
2000 Since Then
2002 The IP Series
2004 Souvenirs
2005 A Subterranean Soundtrack
2008 In Other Words
2013 What I Do

Singles
Ian Pooley
1993 "Limited Edition"
1994 "Pulse Code EP", as Ian Pooley & Alec Empire (with Alec Empire)
1994 "Roller Skate Disco"
1994 "Twin Gods EP"
1995 "Twin Gods Vol. 2"
1995 "Celtic Cross EP"
1995 "Celtic Cross Remixes"
1995 "My Anthem"
1995 "Today"
1996 "Chord Memory"
1996 "Two Space Cowboys on a [Bad] Trip to Texas", as Ian Pooley & The Jaguar (with Alec Empire)
1996 "What's Your Number"
1996 "Relations"
1997 "Calypso EP"
1997 "Gimme Sound"
1997 "Higgledy Piggedly"
1998 "Followed"
1998 "Loopduelle"
1998 "Rock Da Discoteque EP"
1998 "What's Your Number" (re-release)
1999 "Coldwait"
2000 "900 Degrees"
2000 "Coração Tambor" (with Rosanna & Zélia)
2000 "The Allnighter EP"
2001 "Balmes (A Better Life)" (with Esthero)
2002 "Traffic"
2002 "The Fly Shuffle"
2002 "Niteflite"
2002 "Missing You"
2002 "Ready to Flow"
2002 "Piha", as Ian Pooley & Magik J (with Magik J)
2003 "Here We Go!"
2003 "Heke", as Ian Pooley & Magik J (with Magik J)
2004 "Searchin'"
2004 "Heaven" (with Jade and Danni'elle)
2005 "Samo Iluzija"
2006 "Higgledy Piggedly 2006"
2006 "Celtic Cross 2006"
2007 "All Nite"

Ides
1994 "Sweet & Sour EP"
1996 "Plastered EP"
1996 "Elastic EP"
1998 "Limer"
2005 "Right in the Night EP"

Space Cube
 All are collaborations with DJ Tonka
1991 "Space Cube EP"
1991 "Sub Audible"
1992 "Kool Killer EP"
1992 "Kool Killer Vol. 2"
1993 "Kool Killer Vol. 3"
1993 "Kool Killer Mixes EP"
1993 "Unreleased Project EP"
1993 "The Latest Adventures of Kool Killer EP"
1994 "Dschungelfieber"
1994 "Inbound/Outbound"
1995 "Kommerz Killer/Big Bam Bam"
1997 "Unreleased Space Cube Tracks"

T'N'I
 All are collaborations with DJ Tonka
1991 "Low Mass EP"
1991 "Trip Men"
1991 "Do You Still Care" (with Marie Pullins)
1992 "Beam EP"
1993 "Depart EP"
1993 "Dream Team EP"
1993 "I Want To Be Free"
1994 "Mad Situation/Be Straight"

Other aliases
1991 "Emperor/Daylight", as Outrage (with DJ Tonka)
1993 "The Modular", as The Modulor
1996 "Next to Nowhere", as Ansicht
1996 "Skippin' EP", as John Skipper Trax
1996 "Roll With It!", as The Low Frequency Band
1996 "Ice Fractions 1", as Silvershower
1996 "Ice Fractions 2", as Silvershower
1997 "Enlite EP", as Bluelite
1999 "Enlite Juice", as Bluelite
1999 "Valle Valle!", as Pinnchiky
2001 "Viewing a Decade EP", as Quiet Daze
2002 "Skippin' EP", as John Skipper Trax (re-release)

References

External links
Official website

Living people
German male musicians
German house musicians
German techno musicians
German DJs
Remixers
1973 births
Ministry of Sound artists
Electronic dance music DJs